Pomona is an unincorporated community and census-designated place (CDP) located within Galloway Township, in Atlantic County, New Jersey. As of the 2010 United States Census, the CDP's population was 7,124. The area is served as United States Postal Service ZIP code 08240.

Locally, the name "Pomona" is loosely used also to refer to areas adjacent to Pomona proper, including adjoining portions of Hamilton Township and Egg Harbor Township in the vicinity of the Atlantic City International Airport.

Pomona was often described as the home to Stockton University, since the mailing address for the college was a post-office box located in the Pomona Post Office. In 2011, the university changed its mailing address to its main campus (using the street Vera King Farris Drive, Galloway Township, New Jersey).

Geography
According to the U.S. Census Bureau, the Pomona CDP had a total area of 2.797 square miles (7.244 km2), all of which was land.

Demographics

2010 Census

2000 Census
At the 2000 census, there were 4,019 people, 1,297 households and 1,002 families living in the CDP. The population density was 554.2/km2 (1,437.4/mi2). There were 1,357 housing units at an average density of 187.1/km2 (485.3/mi2). The racial makeup of the CDP was 74.15% White, 8.04% African American, 0.35% Native American, 11.99% Asian, 0.02% Pacific Islander, 3.56% from other races, and 1.89% from two or more races. Hispanic or Latino of any race were 7.49% of the population.

There were 1,297 households, of which 45.7% had children under the age of 18 living with them, 61.0% were married couples living together, 10.9% had a female householder with no husband present, and 22.7% were non-families. 18.0% of all households were made up of individuals, and 8.8% had someone living alone who was 65 years of age or older. The average household size was 3.05 and the average family size was 3.47.

30.4% of the population were under the age of 18, 7.3% from 18 to 24, 34.9% from 25 to 44, 18.9% from 45 to 64, and 8.5% who were 65 years of age or older. The median age was 34 years. For every 100 females, there were 95.4 males. For every 100 females age 18 and over, there were 88.4 males.

The median household income was $52,796, and the median family income was $56,846. Males had a median income of $35,554 versus $29,453 for females. The per capita income for the CDP was $18,182. About 2.3% of families and 4.6% of the population were below the poverty line, including 3.3% of those under age 18 and 15.9% of those age 65 or over.

Education
Galloway Township Public Schools operates schools for grades K-8 while Greater Egg Harbor Regional High School District operates area high schools.

Galloway Township residents, including those of Pomona, are zoned to Absegami High School.

Assumption Regional Catholic School, under the Roman Catholic Diocese of Camden, was previously in Pomona, but in September 2007 moved to another campus elsewhere in the township.

Notable people

 Anne Grunow (born c. 1959), senior research scientist at Ohio State University in the Byrd Polar Research Center.
 Samuel Ojserkis (born 1990), rower who competed in the men's eight event at the 2016 Summer Olympics.

References

Census-designated places in Atlantic County, New Jersey
Galloway Township, New Jersey